
This is a list of the 49 players who earned 1991 PGA Tour cards through the PGA Tour Qualifying Tournament in 1990. The final stage was held at PGA West Stadium Course and La Quinta Hotel Golf Club Dunes Course in La Quinta, California. 182 players entered the final stage. Duffy Waldorf won the event.

 PGA Tour rookie in 1991

1991 Results

*PGA Tour rookie in 1991
T = Tied
 The player retained his PGA Tour card for 1992 (finished inside the top 125, excluding non-members)
 The player did not retain his PGA Tour card for 1992, but retained conditional status (finished between 126-150, excluding non-members)
 The player did not retain his PGA Tour card for 1992 (finished outside the top 150)
†Silveira won the Deposit Guaranty Golf Classic, in which money earned was official but the win was not.

Winners on the PGA Tour in 1991

Runners-up on the PGA Tour in 1991

See also
1990 Ben Hogan Tour graduates

References

PGA Tour Qualifying School
PGA Tour Qualifying School Graduates
PGA Tour Qualifying School Graduates